The 1985 Summer 500 was a NASCAR Winston Cup Series race that took place on July 21, 1985, at Pocono International Raceway in Long Pond, Pennsylvania.

Background
Pocono Raceway is one of six superspeedways to hold NASCAR races; the others are Daytona International Speedway, Michigan International Speedway, Auto Club Speedway, Indianapolis Motor Speedway, and Talladega Superspeedway. The track's turns are banked differently; the first is banked at 14°, the second turn at 8°, and the final turn with 6°. However, each of the three straightaways is banked at 2°.

Race report
Two hundred laps were completed spanning . David Pearson would lead the final two laps of his career at this race. In a racing-style that is reminiscent of the 1974 Daytona 500, this race had the most lead changes all season at only 36 compared to 75 in the 1984 NASCAR Winston Cup Series season. Mike Stolarcyk would make his only NASCAR Winston Cup Series start at this event; he was from Whitney Point, New York. While Stolaryck started the race in 37th-place; he would only improve his finishing position to 32nd-place.

The race took three hours and forty-two seconds to complete with Bill Elliott defeating Neil Bonnett by five seconds. There were six cautions for 24 laps. Elliott's 1985 Thunderbird was the same size as Rudd's, Kyle Petty's and Cale's Thunderbirds. They all fit the 1985 Thunderbird NASCAR templates that were standard for the 1985 NASCAR Winston Cup Series season.

Notable crew chiefs who participated in this race included Junie Donlavey, Robin Pemberton, Joey Arrington, Jake Elder, Waddell Wilson, Bud Moore, Harry Hyde, Kirk Shelmerdine and Darrell Bryant. The most dominant drivers in the NASCAR Winston Cup Series during the 1980s were Bill Elliott, Darrell Waltrip, Terry Labonte, Bobby Allison and Dale Earnhardt. Earnhardt blew up his vehicle after 11 laps during the course of the race, thus threatening his dominance of NASCAR during the 1985 season in favor of Bill Elliott and Darrell Waltrip.

Geoff Bodine was the first driver to win the pole, but was stripped of his time shortly after first round qualifying for having illegal fuel. Darrell Waltrip would inherit the award but was stripped for using illegal fuel two weeks after the race was finished. Bill Elliott ended up getting the award instead. There were 40 drivers in the race; 39 of them were American-born while Trevor Boys was born in Canada.

J.D. McDuffie would finish last due to an engine problem on lap 10. This would be one of three starts that year for J.D. McDuffie in a Ford, who rarely ran anything but GM products from 1972 onwards. Bill Elliott's win for Melling Racing would earn him $44,025 in total winnings ($ when adjusted for inflation) while last-place finisher McDuffie would walk away with $2,675 for McDuffie Racing ($ when adjusted for inflation).

Qualifying

Failed to qualify: Steve Gray (racing driver), Mike Potter (#68), George Wiltshire, Bob Park (#19), Bill Scott (#53)

Top 20 finishers

Standings after the race

References

Summer 500
Summer 500
NASCAR races at Pocono Raceway